Peltigera chionophila is a species of foliose lichen in the family Peltigeraceae. It was first formally described in 2000 by Canadian lichenologist Trevor Goward and Belgian lichenologist Bernard Goffinet.

References

Sources
 

chionophila
Lichens of North America
Lichen species
Lichens described in 2000